Group B of the 2006 Fed Cup Asia/Oceania Zone Group I was one of two pools in the Asia/Oceania Zone Group I of the 2006 Fed Cup. Four teams competed in a round robin competition, with the top team and the bottom two teams proceeding to their respective sections of the play-offs: the top teams played for advancement to the World Group II Play-offs, while the bottom teams faced potential relegation to Group II.

India vs. Chinese Taipei

India vs. Philippines

New Zealand vs. Chinese Taipei

New Zealand vs. Philippines

India vs. New Zealand

Chinese Taipei vs. Philippines

See also
Fed Cup structure

References

External links
 Fed Cup website

2006 Fed Cup Asia/Oceania Zone